Jean Anne Carnahan (née Carpenter; born December 20, 1933) is an American politician and writer who was the First Lady of Missouri from 1993 to 2000, and served as the state's junior United States senator from 2001 to 2002. A Democrat, she was appointed to fill the Senate seat of her husband Mel Carnahan, who had been posthumously elected, becoming the first woman to represent Missouri in the U.S. Senate.

Life and career
Born Jean Anne Carpenter in Washington, D.C., to a working-class family, Carnahan was determined to go to college. She and her future husband, Mel, both went to Anacostia High School where they sat next to each other in class.  Jean worked through the year while attending George Washington University. She graduated in 1955 with a degree in Business and Public Administration, the first in her family to graduate from high school and college. She is an alumna of Kappa Delta sorority.

She married Mel Carnahan in 1954 and two years later they moved to his home state of Missouri. As her husband entered politics, she became his political partner. He was elected Governor of Missouri, serving from 1993 to 2000. She was an activist First Lady: an advocate for on-site daycare centers for working families, childhood immunization, abuse centers, the arts, and Habitat for Humanity.

U.S. Senate 

In 2000, Governor Carnahan ran for a Senate seat from Missouri against incumbent Republican John Ashcroft. Three weeks before election day, the governor was killed in an airplane crash, along with their son Randy (who piloted the plane) and Chris Sifford, the governor's chief of staff and campaign advisor. Due to the short amount of time before the election, Missouri election law did not allow his name to be removed from the ballot. Acting Governor Roger Wilson announced that he would appoint Jean Carnahan if her husband were to posthumously win the election, making her effectively the Democratic candidate by proxy.

Out of respect, Ashcroft suspended his campaign during the mourning period for the governor. Jean Carnahan did not actively campaign but announced that she intended to accept Wilson's appointment; she filmed one campaign commercial.

The race had been close before the accident, and Mel Carnahan posthumously won (51-48%), receiving 1.19 million votes out of 2.36 million cast. Jean Carnahan was appointed to the Senate in 2001, but under Missouri law, she would serve only until a special election could be held.

Ashcroft was subsequently nominated by President George W. Bush to be US attorney general, and because cabinet appointments are subject to Senate approval, Carnahan found herself in the unusual position of casting a vote against the nomination of her de facto opponent.

On the evening of September 8, 2001, Carnahan was at her house in Rolla when it caught fire. According to her chief of staff, she had "heard a noise" prior to learning about the fire from her brother-in-law. Carnahan was not harmed and was able to get out of the house.

In 2002, the special election was held for the remainder of the six-year term. Carnahan ran, but was defeated in a close race by Republican Jim Talent; the margin was only 22,000 votes (49.8–48.6%).

Post-Senate 
In 2004, Carnahan's son, Russ Carnahan, was elected to Congress, and her daughter Robin Carnahan was elected Missouri Secretary of State. Robin's bid to follow her mother as a United States senator failed, however, when she was defeated by Republican U.S. Representative Roy Blunt in the 2010 election to succeed retiring Republican Senator Kit Bond. Russ Carnahan lost his House seat in the 2012 elections after his district was eliminated, forcing him to run in a Democratic primary against fellow incumbent William Lacy Clay, Jr., whose district encompassing inner-city St. Louis was kept largely intact.

Since losing her Senate race, Jean Carnahan has continued as an activist and author. She has written six books and numerous opinion pieces. The title of her 2004 book is a phrase used during the 2000 campaign to elect her husband to the Senate after his death, Don't Let the Fire Go Out.

She is among the former Missouri First Ladies who have participated in the cherry blossom tree planting in Marshfield, Missouri.

Electoral history
2000 race for U.S. Senate
Mel Carnahan (D), 51% (posthumously elected; Jean Carnahan appointed to fill seat)
John Ashcroft (R) (inc.), 48%
2002 race for U.S. Senate (special election to fill remainder of term)
Jim Talent (R), 50%
Jean Carnahan (D) (inc.), 49%

Books
(1998) If Walls Could Talk: The Story of Missouri’s First Families. MMPI .
(1999) Christmas at the Mansion. MMPI .
(2000) Will You Say a Few Words?. Walsworth Publishing Co. .
(2004) Don’t Let the Fire Go Out!. University of Missouri Press. .
(2009) The Tide Always Comes Back. Skyhorse Publishing .
(2012) A Little Help from My Friends...and Other Hilarious Tales of Graying Graciously. Vantage Point Books .

See also
Women in the United States Senate

References

External links

Bio by Fired Up Missouri
Online News Hour account of the 2000 election 
Online News Hour account of the 2002 election 
 

|-

|-

|-

1933 births
21st-century American politicians
21st-century American women politicians
Baptists from Missouri
Carnahan family
Democratic Party United States senators from Missouri
Female United States senators
First Ladies and Gentlemen of Missouri
George Washington University School of Business alumni
Living people
Missouri Democrats
People from Rolla, Missouri
Writers from Missouri
Writers from Washington, D.C.
Women in Missouri politics
People from Southeast (Washington, D.C.)